Lotharingia was a short-lived medieval successor kingdom of the Carolingian Empire. As a more durable later duchy of the Ottonian Empire, it comprised present-day Lorraine (France), Luxembourg, Saarland (Germany), Netherlands, and the eastern half of Belgium, along with parts of today's North Rhine-Westphalia (Germany), Rhineland-Palatinate (Germany) and Nord (France). It was named after King Lothair II, who received this territory after his father Lothair I's kingdom of Middle Francia was divided among his three sons in 855.

Lotharingia resulted from the tripartite division in 855 of the kingdom of Middle Francia, which itself was formed after the threefold division of the Carolingian Empire by the Treaty of Verdun of 843. Conflict between East and West Francia over Lotharingia was based on the fact that these were the old Frankish homelands of Austrasia, so possession of them was a matter of great prestige as true claimant of Frankish imperial legacy.

Name
Because Lotharingia lacked a single historic or ethnic identity, contemporaries were unsure what to call it. It was known as regnum quondam Lotharii or regnum Lotharii ("kingdom [once] Lothair's") and its inhabitants Lotharii (from Lotharius), Lotharienses (from Lothariensis), or Lotharingi (which gives the modern Dutch, German, and Luxembourgish names for the province Lotharingen, Lothringen, and Lothringen respectively). The latter term, formed with the Germanic suffix -ing, indicating ancestral or familial relationships, gave rise to the Latin term Lotharingia (from the Latin suffix -ia, indicating a country) in the tenth century. Later French terms such as "Lorraine" and "Lothier" are derived from this Latin term.

Middle Francia, 843–855

In 817, emperor Louis the Pious made plans for division of the Carolingian Empire among his three sons after his death. Unforeseen in 817 was a further heir besides Louis's three grown sons. A fourth son, Charles the Bald, was born to Louis's second wife Judith of Bavaria in 823. When Louis tried in 833 to re-divide the empire for the benefit of Charles, he met with opposition from his adult sons, Lothair, Pepin, and Louis. A decade of civil war and fluctuating alliances followed, punctuated by brief periods of peace.

Pepin died in 838, and Louis the Pious in 840. The remaining three brothers made peace and divided the Empire with the 843 Treaty of Verdun. Lothair, as the eldest, kept the imperial title and received a long strip of territories stretching from the North Sea to southern Italy. The logic of the division was that Lothair had the crown of the Kingdom of Italy, which had been his subkingdom under Louis the Pious, and that as emperor he should rule in Aachen, the capital of the first Carolingian emperor, Charlemagne, and in Rome, the ancient capital of emperors. Middle Francia (Latin Francia media) thus included all the land between Aachen and Rome, and it has sometimes been called by historians the "Lotharingian axis".

Kingdom of Lotharingia, 855–900

In 855, when Lothair I was dying in Prüm Abbey, he divided his kingdom among his three sons with the Treaty of Prüm. To the eldest son, Louis II, went Italy, with the imperial title. To the youngest, Charles, still a minor, went Provence. To the middle son, Lothair II, went the remaining territories to the north of Provence, a kingdom which lacked ethnic or linguistic unity.

Lothair II ruled from Aachen and did not venture outside his kingdom. When he died in 869, Lothair II left no legitimate children, but one illegitimate son - Hugh, Duke of Alsace. His uncles, king of East Francia Louis the German and West Francia Charles the Bald (who wanted to rule the whole of Lotharingia) agreed to divide Lotharingia between them with the 870 Treaty of Meerssen - the western half went to West Francia and the eastern half to East Francia. Thus, Lotharingia, as a united kingdom, ceased to exist for some years. In 876, Charles the Bald invaded eastern Lotharingia with the intent to capture it, but was defeated near Andernach by Louis's son, Louis the Younger.

In 879, Louis the Younger was invited by a faction of the West Frankish nobility to succeed king Louis the Stammerer, Charles's son, on the throne of West Francia. After a brief war, Louis the Stammerer's young sons, Carloman II and Louis III, ceded western Lotharingia to Louis. The border between the two kingdoms was established at Saint-Quentin in 880 by the Treaty of Ribemont.

In November 887, Arnulf of Carinthia called a council of East Frankish nobility to depose emperor Charles the Fat, who by 884 had succeeded to the thrones of all the kingdoms of the Empire. The Lotharingian aristocracy, in an attempt to assert its right to elect a sovereign, joined the other East Frankish nobles in deposing Charles the Fat in 887 and elected Arnulf as their king. The rule of Arnulf in East Francia was initially opposed by Guy III of Spoleto, who became king of Italy, and by Rudolph I of Burgundy, who was elected king in the southern half of former Middle Francia - Upper Burgundy. Rudolph had intended to make himself king over the whole of Lothair II's former kingdom, but had to be content with Burgundia.

Arnulf defeated the Vikings in 891 and dislodged them from their settlements at Louvain. In 895, he appointed his illegitimate son Zwentibold as the king of Lotharingia who ruled semi-independently until he was overthrown and killed by Reginar on August 13, 900. The kingdom then ceased to exist and became a duchy.

Duchy of Lotharingia, 900–959
The young king of East Francia Louis the Child appointed Gebhard to be the duke of Lotharingia in 903. His title was recorded in contemporary Latin as dux regni quod a multis Hlotharii dicitur: "duke of the kingdom that many call Lothair's". He died in 910 fighting Hungarian invaders.

When non-Carolingian Conrad I of Germany was elected king of East Francia in 911, Lotharingian nobles under the new duke Reginar voted to attach their duchy to West Francia, still ruled by the Carolingian dynasty. In 915, Charles the Simple rewarded him by granting him the title of margrave. Reginar was succeeded by his son Gilbert who used the title dux Lotharingiae: "duke of Lotharingia".

When the West Franks deposed Charles in 922, he remained king in Lotharingia, from where he attempted to reconquer his kingdom in 923. He was captured and imprisoned by Heribert II of Vermandois until his death in 929. In 923, king Henry the Fowler of East Francia used this opportunity and invaded Lotharingia (including Alsace). In 925, Lotharingians under Gilbert elected Henry the Fowler to be their king. In 930, Gilbert's loyalty was rewarded and he received the prestigious hand of Henry's daughter Gerberga in marriage.

On Henry's death in 936, Gilbert rebelled and tried to swap Lotharingian allegiance to the West Franks, since their king Rudolph was weak and would interfere less in local affairs. In 939, Henry's son and successor, Otto I, Holy Roman Emperor, invaded Lotharingia, and at the Battle of Andernach defeated Gilbert who drowned trying to flee across the Rhine.

The dukes of Lotharingia were thereafter royal appointees. Henry I, Duke of Bavaria was duke for two years, followed in 941 by duke Otto, who, in 944, was followed by Conrad. Lotharingia was turned into a junior stem duchy whose dukes had a vote in royal elections. While the other stem duchies had tribal or historic identities, Lotharingia's identity was solely political.

King Louis IV of West Francia tried to maintain a claim to Lotharingia by marrying Gilbert's widow and Otto's sister Gerberga. In his turn, Otto I accepted homage from West Francia's Hugh the Great and Herbert II, Count of Vermandois at Attigny in 942. The weak Louis IV had no choice but to agree to Otto's continued suzerainty over Lotharingia. In 944, West Francia invaded Lotharingia, but retreated after Otto I responded with mobilization of a large army under Herman I, Duke of Swabia.

Partition of 959 and later history

In 953, Duke Conrad rebelled against Otto I, and was removed from power and replaced by Otto's brother Bruno the Great, who finally pacified Lotharingia in 959 by dividing it into Lotharingia superior (Upper Lorraine or Southern Lorraine) under Frederick I, and Lotharingia inferior (Lower Lotharingia, Lower Lorraine or Northern Lotharingia) under Godfrey I.

In 978, king Lothair of West Francia invaded the region and captured Aachen, but Otto II, Holy Roman Emperor, counterattacked and reached the walls of Paris. In 980, Lothair renounced his rights to Lotharingia.

Except for one brief period (1033–44, under Gothelo I), the division was never reversed and the margraves soon raised their separate fiefs into duchies. In the twelfth century the ducal authority in Lower Lotharingia (or Lower Lorraine) fragmented, causing the formation of the Duchy of Limburg and the Duchy of Brabant, whose rulers retained the title Duke of Lothier (derived from "Lotharingia"). With the disappearance of a "lower" Lorraine, the duchy of Upper Lorraine became the primary referent for "Lorraine" within the Holy Roman Empire.

After centuries of French invasions and occupations, Lorraine was finally ceded to France at the close of the War of the Polish Succession (1737). In 1766, the duchy was inherited by the French crown and became Lorraine. In 1871, after the Franco-Prussian War, the northern portions of Lorraine were merged with Alsace to become the province of Alsace-Lorraine in the German Empire. Today the greater part of the French side of the Franco-German border belongs to the Lorraine region of France.

See also
List of rulers of Lotharingia (Lorraine)
Duchy of Upper Lorraine
Duchy of Lower Lorraine

References

Bibliography

Primary sources
Annales vedastini at The Latin Library.
Annales xantenses qui dicuntur at The Latin Library.

Secondary sources
 Bartholomew, John, and Wakelyn Nightingale.  Monasteries and Patrons in the Gorze Reform: Lotharingia C.850-1000 (2001)
 Clark, Samuel. State and Status: The Rise of the State and Aristocratic Power in Western Europe (1995) pp 53–79 excerpt
MacLean, Simon. (2013). "Shadow Kingdom: Lotharingia and the Frankish World, c.850–c.1050". History Compass, 11: 443–457.
 Timothy Reuter, ed. The New Cambridge Medieval History, III: c. 900–c. 1024, Cambridge: Cambridge University Press, 2005. excerpts

Further reading
 Ascherson, Neal, "A Mess of Tiny Principalities" (review of Simon Winder, Lotharingia: A Personal History of Europe's Lost Country, Farrar, Straus, and Giroux, 2019, 504 pp.), The New York Review of Books, vol. LXVI, no. 20 (19 December 2019), pp. 66–68.

 
855 establishments
States and territories established in the 850s
States and territories disestablished in the 940s
9th-century establishments in Europe
10th-century disestablishments in Europe
Former countries
Former monarchies of Europe